Stipe Jurić (born 19 November 1998) is a Bosnian professional footballer who plays as a forward for ŁKS Łódź.

References

External links

1998 births
Living people
People from Tomislavgrad
Croats of Bosnia and Herzegovina
Bosnia and Herzegovina footballers
Premier League of Bosnia and Herzegovina players
I liga players
NK Široki Brijeg players
ŁKS Łódź players
Bosnia and Herzegovina youth international footballers
Bosnia and Herzegovina under-21 international footballers
Association football forwards
Expatriate footballers in Poland